The Suzuki Boulevard C109R motorcycle was introduced in 2008 as Suzuki's V-Twin Cruiser. The same model is sold in Europe as the Suzuki Intruder C1800R.

Each bore is lined with Suzuki's SCEM (Suzuki Composite Electrochemical Material) to aid heat transfer, improve piston-to-cylinder clearances and reduce weight. The engine has electronic fuel injection system  with 52 mm throttle bodies and dual spark plugs. The transmission is five speed.

See also  
Suzuki Boulevard M109R

References

External links 

Boulevard C109R
Cruiser motorcycles
Motorcycles introduced in 2006